Artillery Regiment may refer to the following military units:
Artillery Regiment (2000), current Swedish Army unit
Artillery Regiment (1636), Swedish Army unit active 1636–1794
Danish Artillery Regiment, also sometimes called simply Artillery Regiment
Regiment of Artillery, Indian military corps
Royal Regiment of Artillery, British military corps
Regiment of Artillery (Bangladesh)